The 1998 FIA Cross Country Rally World Cup season was the 6th season of the FIA Cross Country Rally World Cup. Jean-Louis Schlesser was the drivers' champion driving his own buggy. Mitsubishi won the Manufacturers' cup.

Calendar
The calendar featured seven events.

Results

Drivers' Championship

The best 6 results, including not more than the best 2 results in Bajas, are taken into account for the final classification of the Cup.

Manufacturers' Championship

In order to be featured in the final classification of the Cup, a manufacturer must enter at least 5 events. Only Group T1 and T2 cars are eligible. 

The best 6 results, including not more than the best 2 results in Bajas, are taken into account for the final classification of the Cup.

References

Cross Country Rally World Cup
Cross Country Rally World Cup